Carol Murphy may refer to:
 Carol J. Murphy (1932–2011), American Republican Party politician in the New Jersey General Assembly
 Carol A. Murphy, American Democratic Party politician in the New Jersey General Assembly